Ross Alan Shafer (born December 10, 1954) is an American comedian, network television host, and motivational and leadership speaker/consultant. He has authored nine business books, won a stand-up comedy competition, and earned six Emmys as a network talk and game show host.

Biography
Born in McMinnville, Oregon, Shafer graduated from Federal Way High School in Federal Way, Washington. As a high school All-Conference football player, he received a scholarship to play linebacker for the University of Puget Sound in Tacoma, Washington, where he earned a business marketing degree.

Shafer said of his early life, "I had trouble finding anything that I was passionate about, or that made me happy." He then opened a "combination pet and stereo store". His first foray into acting came in the form of a community play; afterward, he tried out for a stand-up comedy competition.

From 1984 to 1989, Shafer hosted the local Seattle-based talk and comedy show, Almost Live!, and also hosted Fox's late night talk show, The Late Show. 

In the 1986-1987 season, Shafer hosted the Canadian game show “Love Me Love Me Not (game show)” that also aired in the United States on the USA Network but was not a hit and ended after one full season of 130 episodes.

From 1990 to 1991, Shafer hosted a short-lived revival of Match Game on ABC.

Ross works as a keynote speaker and leadership coach in the areas of market share growth, customer friction, and workforce motivator. He coaches leaders and teams on how to cross-pollinate innovative ideas about emerging trends, shifting buying habits, and the motivation of work forces during mergers and acquisitions. His clients include Ace Hardware, Aflac, and Hard Rock Cafe. Ross also authored a cooking book, Cook-Like-A-Stud.

Bibliography
Cook-Like-A-Stud (1991) 
Nobody Moved Your Cheese! (2003) 
The Customer Shouts Back! (2006) 
Are You Relevant?  (2009) 
Grab More Market Share  (2011) 
Shy to Confident (2013) 
Absolutely Necessary (2015)  
Behave Like a Startup (2016) 
Success: It's on You  (2016) 
No More Customer Friction (2017) 
Rattled (2021)

See also 
 The Late Show, 1988 hosts

References

External links

Ross Shafer Website
Twitter
Facebook
YouTube

1954 births
American game show hosts
21st-century American comedians
American television talk show hosts
Late night television talk show hosts
Living people
People from Denver
People from McMinnville, Oregon
People from Seattle
University of Puget Sound alumni